Waldman is a surname.

People with the surname
Notable people with the surname include:

Anne Waldman, American poet
Ariel Waldman, science populariser and author
Ayelet Waldman, author
Danielle Goldstein Waldman (born 1985), American-Israeli show jumper
Eliezer Waldman, Israeli rabbi
H Waldman (born 1972), American-Israeli basketball player
Irwin Waldman, American psychologist
Louis A. Waldman, American art historian and artist
Michael Waldman British palaeontologist
Morris D. Waldman (1879–1963), Hungarian-American rabbi and social worker
Myron Waldman, American animator
Ronnie Waldman, British television executive
Serena Waldman
Steven Waldman, Media advisor at FCC
Suzyn Waldman, American sports broadcaster

Fictional characters
Doctor Waldman, character in the novel Frankenstein

See also
 Waldmann